2600 may refer to:

2600 hertz, the audio tone used in phreaking to gain control of telephone networks
2600: The Hacker Quarterly, a magazine named after the aforementioned 2,600 Hz tone
Atari 2600 video game console
ATI's Radeon R600 Radeon HD 2xxx series graphics card
ARP 2600 analog synthesizer
Alfa Romeo 2600, a car
Nokia 2600, a mobile phone released in 2004
Nokia 2600 classic, a mobile phone released in 2008
The last year of the 26th century
The number 2600

See also
 2600 series (disambiguation)